The following television stations in the United States brand as channel 15 (though neither using virtual channel 15 nor broadcasting on physical RF channel 15):

 WCWN in Schenectady, New York
 WTCN-CD in Palm Beach, Florida

15 branded